Belgium competed at the inaugural 7 sports 2018 European Championships from 2 to 12 August 2018. It competed in all sports.

Medallists

Aquatics

Swimming

Men

Women

Mixed

Athletics

Men 
Track and road

Field events

Combined events – Decathlon

Women 
Track and road

Field events

Combined events – Heptathlon

Cycling

Road

Men

Women

Track

Elimination race

Keirin

Madison

Omnium

Points race

Pursuit

Scratch

Sprint

Time trial

Mountain bike

External links
 European Championships official site 

2018
Nations at the 2018 European Championships
2018 in Belgian sport